Mandeni Local Municipality (formerly eNdondakusuka Local Municipality) is an administrative area in the iLembe District of KwaZulu-Natal in South Africa.

Manufacturing, elementary work and plant and machine work are the highest non-farming categories of labour. Mandeni includes substantial areas of commercial agriculture, with the bulk of these areas under sugar-cane. Agriculture is the main employment sector in the area.

Main places
The 2001 census divided the municipality into the following main places:

Politics 

The municipal council consists of thirty-five members elected by mixed-member proportional representation. Eighteen councillors are elected by first-past-the-post voting in eighteen wards, while the remaining seventeen are chosen from party lists so that the total number of party representatives is proportional to the number of votes received. In the election of 1 November 2021 the African National Congress (ANC) won a reduced majority of nineteen seats on the council.

The following table shows the results of the 2021 election.

References

External links
 http://www.mandeni.gov.za/

Local municipalities of the iLembe District Municipality
Mandeni Local Municipality